Yusufu Bala Usman (1945 – 24 September 2005) was a Nigerian historian and  politician,     who was one of the scholars who shaped Nigerian historiography. He  was the founder of the Centre for Democratic Development, Research and Training at Ahmadu Bello University, Zaria.

Life
Usman was born in Musawa, Katsina State, his father was Durbin of Katsina and brother of Usman Nagogo, his paternal grandfather was Sarkin Katsina Muhammadu Dikko Dan Gidado and his mother was a daughter of Abdullahi Bayero, former Emir of Kano. He attended Musawa Junior Primary School, Kankia Senior Primary School, Minna Senior Primary School and Government College, Kaduna. He then went to study at the University Tutorial College and then at University of Lancaster where he completed his studies with a degree in History and Political Science. He returned to Nigeria in 1967 to become a teacher at Barewa College, Zaria where he taught until 1971. Usman started his graduate studies in 1970 at Ahmadu Bello University, earning his PhD degree in 1974. He started lecturing at the university as a part-time lecturer before being promoted to full-time.

During the Nigerian Second Republic, he was briefly the Secretary to the Kaduna State government under the PRP led Balarabe Musa administration.

Academic career
Usman was a major figure among post colonial historians at Ahmadu Bello University,  his outlook on African history involves support for the use of oral and linguistic sources along with written and archaeological sources. He felt all sources are subject to bias and that increased scrutiny of oral sources for distortions and colourings was not extended to many written sources by European writers. To him, the historian cannot be divorced from his education and molding as a scholar and the historicity of the European writers likely influenced some of their writings. Some of his reflections on the writing of African history includes a critique of Heinrich Barth, a respected source among Western scholars, Usman thought Barth was too focused on the physical and genetic characteristics of those he was studying which he felt was a result of the dominant traditions of nineteenth century European history writing.

References

Sources

1945 births
2005 deaths
20th-century Nigerian historians
Academic staff of Ahmadu Bello University